The 2019–20 ISU Speed Skating World Cup, officially the ISU World Cup Speed Skating 2019–2020, was a series of six international speed skating competitions that ran from November 2019 through March 2020.

Calendar
The detailed schedule for the season.

Men's standings

500 m
Final classification

1000 m
Final classification

1500 m
Final classification

Long distances
Final classification

Mass start
Final classification

Team pursuit
Final classification

Team sprint
Final classification

Women's standings

500 m
Final classification

1000 m
Final classification

1500 m
Final classification

Long distances
Final classification

Mass start
Final classification

Team pursuit
Final classification

Team sprint
Final classification

References

External links
 ISU World Cup Speed Skating website

 
19-20
Isu Speed Skating World Cup, 2018-19
Isu Speed Skating World Cup, 2019-20